Return of the SP1200 is the fourth instrumental hip hop album by hip hop producer Pete Rock. The album was released on April 13, 2019 (Record Store Day) exclusively on vinyl on Rock's latest imprint, Tru Soul Records. The physical release of the album was on April 26. The album contains 15 tracks that are instrumentals that were produced between the years 1990–1998. It includes additional scratches by J. Rocc of the Beat Junkies. The album cover was created by Sanford Greene to illustrate the events of 2016–2019 in the United States. This was the first time in Rock's career that instrumental beats from the 1990s were released.

Track listing

Credits 
From the CD :

 David Kutch – Mastering
 Pete Rock – Producer, Sampler, E-mu Systems SP-1200
 Jamie Staub – mixing
 Marek Stycos – Recording
 J. Rocc – Turntables [Scratches]

Charts

References

External links 
 

2019 albums
Instrumental hip hop albums
Pete Rock albums
Albums produced by Pete Rock